The 2019 Nigerian Senate election in Ebonyi State was held on February 23, 2019, to elect members of the Nigerian Senate to represent Ebonyi State. Michael Ama Nnachi representing Ebonyi South, Obinna Ogba representing Ebonyi Central and Sam Egwu representing Ebonyi North all won on the platform of Peoples Democratic Party.

Overview

Summary

Results

Ebonyi South 
A total of 9 candidates registered with the Independent National Electoral Commission to contest in the election. PDP candidate Michael Ama-Nnachi won the election, defeating APC candidate, Prince Nwaeze Onu and 7 other party candidates. Ama-Nnachi scored 103,751 votes, while  APC candidate Onu scored 19,663 votes.

Ebonyi Central 
A total of 14 candidates registered with the Independent National Electoral Commission to contest in the election. PDP candidate, Joseph Ogba won the election, defeating APC candidate Julius Ucha and 12 other party candidates. Ogba pulled 62,452 votes, while APC candidate Ucha scored 46,672.

Ebonyi North 
A total of 11 candidates registered with the Independent National Electoral Commission to contest in the election. PDP candidate Sam Egwu won the election, defeating APC candidate Mathias Adum. Egwu pulled 80,711 votes while his closest rival Adum pulled 38,734.

References 

Ebonyi State senatorial elections
2019 Ebonyi State elections
Ebonyi State Senate elections